Monkhopton is a village and civil parish in Shropshire, England. It is 6.5 miles south of Much Wenlock. There is an Anglican church: Its co-ordinates are 52:32.2836N 2:33.2589W.

See also
Listed buildings in Monkhopton

References

Civil parishes in Shropshire
Hamlets in Shropshire